A stannide can refer to an intermetallic compound containing tin combined with one or more other metals; an anion consisting solely of tin atoms or a compound containing such an anion, or, in the field of organometallic chemistry an ionic compound containing an organotin anion  (e.g.see an alternative name for such  a compound is stannanide.)

Binary alkali and alkaline earth stannides
Even with these metals not all of the compounds formed can be considered to be ionic with localised bonding, for example  Sr3Sn5, a metallic compound, contains {Sn5} square pyramidal units.

Ternary alkali and alkaline earth stannides
Ternary (where there is an alkali or alkaline earth metal, a transition metal as well as tin e.g. LiRh3Sn5 and MgRuSn4) have been investigated.

Other metal stannides
Binary (involving one other metal) and ternary (involving two other metals) intermetallic stannides have been investigated. Niobium stannide, Nb3Sn is perhaps the best known superconducting tin intermetallics. This is more commonly called "niobium-tin".

Stannide ions, 
Some examples of stannide Zintl ions are listed below. Some of them contain 2-centre 2-electron bonds (2c-2e), others are "electron deficient" and bonding sometimes can be described using polyhedral skeletal electron pair theory (Wade's rules) where the number of valence electrons contributed by each tin atom is considered to be 2 (the s electrons do not contribute).
Sn4− found for example in Mg2Sn.
, tetrahedral with 2c-2e bonds e.g. in CsSn.
, tetrahedral closo-cluster with  10 electrons (2n + 2).
(Sn2−)n zig-zag chain polymeric anion with 2c-2e bonds found for example in BaSn.
 closo-cluster, 12 electrons (2n + 2), (i.e. trigonal bipyramidal) in (2,2,2-crypt-Na)2Sn5.
 polymeric two-dimensional anion in NaSn2.
 a paramagnetic, 21 electrons, closo- cluster anion (D3h symmetry), 1 more electron than the 20 (2n + 2) predicted by polyhedral skeletal electron pair theory.
 polymeric two-dimensional anion in Na7Sn12

References

Tin
Intermetallics
Anions
Cluster chemistry